Layfield is a surname. Notable people with the surname include:

 John "Bradshaw" Layfield, American businessman, wrestler, and television personality
 John Layfield (theologian) (died 1617), English scholar and bible translator
 Jonelle Layfield
 Kirstine Layfield

See also
Leyfield, a surname